is a Japanese politician from the Democratic Party of Japan. She serves as member of the House of Councillors since 2010 as a national proportional representative.

References

1963 births
Living people
People from Tokyo
Democratic Party of Japan politicians
Members of the House of Councillors (Japan)